Mad Catz Interactive, Inc. was an American company that provided interactive entertainment products marketed under the Mad Catz, GameShark (gaming products) and TRITTON (audio products) brands. Mad Catz also distributed video game products for third-party partners. Following a 2017 bankruptcy, Mad Catz Global Limited (a Hong Kong-based company) acquired the trademarks, and now distributes these products.

History

1989–2000

Mad Catz was founded in 1989. It focused on accessories such as control pads, memory cards, connection cables, headphones and other human interface devices for the PC and various video game consoles. Mad Catz also published console game titles, such as Real World Golf 1 and 2, MC Groovz Dance Craze and Pump It Up.

Mad Catz Interactive, Inc. was incorporated under the Canada Business Corporations Act on August 25, 1993. The company was acquired in 2000 by the Toronto-based GTR Group, Inc. for a purchase cost of US$33.3 million, along with Games Trader (which collected and sold previously played and republished games) and ZapYou.com (which focused on e-commerce solutions).

2000–2009
In 2000, Mad Catz released the MC2 Racing Wheel for the Sony PlayStation, which was awarded the Golden Award by Incite Video Gaming Magazine, and the Mario Andretti Racing Wheel, which GameSpy judged as the best peripheral of the 2000 Electronic Entertainment Expo (E3). The company produced 12 licensed controllers for the launch of the Sega Dreamcast and also released Internet-related accessories such as the Panther DC and keyboard adapter.

In September 2001, GTR Group decided to capitalize on the strength of the Mad Catz brand and changed its corporate name to Mad Catz Interactive, Inc., closing its GamesTrader and ZapYou.com business units. The year 2001 saw the release of Microsoft's Xbox and Nintendo's GameCube and Game Boy Advance. Mad Catz offered products for these launches, such as the Control Pad Pro for GameCube, the Lynx Control Pad and the BeatPad (dancepad) controller for the PlayStation 2, the Game Boy FlipLight, and memory cards for the Xbox.

In January 2003, Mad Catz acquired the GameShark brand, described as "the industry leader in video game enhancement software, [enabling] players to take full advantage of the secret codes, short cuts, hints and cheats incorporated by video game publishers into their game offerings," and associated intellectual properties from InterAct for US$5 million.

In September 2007, Mad Catz acquired UK-based company Joytech for US$3.7 million. In November 2007, Mad Catz further diversified into the videogame accessory market by acquiring European-based manufacturer Saitek for US$30 million.

In 2008, Capcom commissioned Mad Catz to produce a limited number of ArcadeSticks and six-button controllers, branded as “FightSticks” and “FightPads,” to coincide with the launch of their Street Fighter IV fighting game. Due to the unanticipated demand for these products, production on these controllers was ramped up from their originally limited numbers. The FightStick remains a mainstay of the Mad Catz product line. In 2008, the FightStick's popularity spurred Mad Catz' involvement in the pro-gaming community, and Mad Catz has a strong presence at shows such as EVO, PAX, and San Diego Comic-Con. In 2009, Mad Catz released licensed controllers for Call of Duty: Modern Warfare 2 and Call of Duty: Black Ops.

2010–2017

In 2010, Mad Catz released officially licensed controllers for Rock Band 3, including a keyboard controller, a microphone controller, drum kits, and two guitar controllers (both the familiar five-button and the Fender Mustang “Pro” 102-button guitar). That same year, Mad Catz acquired TRITTON Technologies, a San Diego-based gaming audio headset firm, in May 2010 for US$1 million at closing. In June 2010, Mad Catz announced an agreement with Major League Gaming (MLG) to produce the MLG Pro Circuit Controller for Xbox 360 and PlayStation 3. Mad Catz sponsored MLG Pro Circuit Competitions.

In 2011, Mad Catz’ Cyborg-branded R.A.T.7 Gaming Mouse was named “Best PC Accessory of 2010” by IGN. The company returned to software distribution by publishing Jonah Lomu Rugby Challenge, Damage Inc. Pacific Squadron WWII (a World War II flight simulation game with a custom joystick), and Rock Band 3. Mad Catz acquired certain assets of V Max Simulation Corporation, which designs, constructs, integrates and operates flight simulation equipment and develops flight simulation software.

Mad Catz has continued its focus on peripherals and accessories, such as the range of R.A.T. gaming mice and TRITTON-branded gaming headsets. In January 2013, Mad Catz announced its "GameSmart" initiative, a range of products using the Bluetooth Smart stack featuring game and hardware independence, simplified setup, longer battery life and universal compatibility. Announced products include the R.A.T.M Wireless Mobile Gaming Mouse, the F.R.E.Q.M Mobile Stereo Headset, M.O.U.S.9 Wireless Mouse, and the C.T.R.L.R Mobile Gamepad. The "GameSmart" initiative is intended to introduce an industry standardization to the mobile world.

In June 2013, Mad Catz announced the M.O.J.O. Android Micro Console, described as "a supercharged smart phone with no screen that plugs into your flat screen TV to bring the living room experience to mobile gaming." M.O.J.O. is designed to interact seamlessly with Mad Catz's GameSmart controllers, mice, keyboards, headsets, and the rest of its gaming peripherals. In 2013, Mad Catz produced the Killer Instinct Arcade FightStick Tournament Edition 2, the first fighting game controller available for the Xbox One, the then-latest Microsoft gaming console, that started shipping in late November 2013.

Mad Catz helped spur interest in the burgeoning field of esports by sponsoring the inaugural ESL One at Madison Square Garden in October 2014, as well as sponsoring the Capcom Pro Tour featuring Street Fighter IV.

In April 2015, Mad Catz announced that it would co-publish Rock Band 4 along with Harmonix, in addition to making the controllers for the game. Under the terms of the agreement, Mad Catz was responsible for worldwide retail sales, promotion, and distribution for the Rock Band 4 game and its hardware bundles. Harmonix handled Rock Band 4 digital sales and content. Rock Band 4 was launched on October 6, 2015.

In August 2015, Mad Catz announced that it will work with Cloud Imperium Games to create licensed simulation products for its space simulation game Star Citizen. These products, produced under Mad Catz's Saitek brand, were first unveiled at Gamescom 2015.

On February 9, 2016, Mad Catz announced that it would lay off 37 percent of its workforce and stated that "Rock Band sell-through was lower than originally forecast resulting in higher inventory balances as well as lower margins due to increased promotional activity with retailers." This followed the resignations of company president and CEO Darren Richardson, senior VP of business affairs Whitney Peterson, and company chairman Thomas Brown the day prior.

On September 15, 2016, Logitech acquired Saitek, Mad Catz' simulation brand specializing in computer joysticks for $13 million.

In March 2017, the New York Stock Exchange reported to the company that it was in the stages of delisting the company from the Exchange due to "abnormally low" stock value, which Mad Catz did not plan to appeal.

Bankruptcy
Mad Catz ceased operations on March 30, 2017, and filed a voluntary petition for relief under Chapter 7 of U.S. Bankruptcy code to initiate an orderly liquidation of its assets.

Return 
On 4 January 2018, Mad Catz Global Limited (a new company headquartered in Kowloon, Hong Kong), with new ownership of previous Mad Catz trademarks, announced the return of the Mad Catz brand and the launch of a new line of products at CES 2018. Mad Catz Global Limited has continued the brand's development of gaming peripherals such as mice, keyboards, headphones, and controllers.

References

External links 

 Official Mad Catz website
 Official TRITTON website
 Official SAITEK website
 Official Mad Catz website in Germany

Defunct video game companies of the United States
Video game companies based in California
Computer peripheral companies
Manufacturing companies based in San Diego
Video game companies established in 1989
Video game companies disestablished in 2017
1989 establishments in California
2017 disestablishments in California
Companies that have filed for Chapter 7 bankruptcy
Companies that filed for Chapter 11 bankruptcy in 2017
Companies formerly listed on NYSE American
Companies formerly listed on the Toronto Stock Exchange
Companies traded over-the-counter in the United States
Defunct companies based in California